Kamphaengphet Football Club (Thai สโมสรฟุตบอลจังหวัดกำแพงเพชร) is a Thailand professional football club based in Kamphaeng Phet Province. The club currently plays in Thai League 3 Northern region.

In 2009, the club, nicknamed Cha Kung Rao Warriors, was formed and was admitted to the Regional League Northern Division. Its home games are played at Cha Kung Rao Stadium. Seksan Siripong was named as the first coach and chairman of the club.

Stadium and locations

Season by season record

Players

Current squad

References

External links 
 Official website of Kamphaengphet FC
 Kamphaengphet FC on Weltfussballarchiv
 Official Facebookpage of Kamphaengphet FC

 
Association football clubs established in 2009
Football clubs in Thailand
Kamphaeng Phet province
2009 establishments in Thailand